The Canadian Alpine Ski Championships is an alpine skiing competition organized by Alpine Canada.

Organization 
Theses championships have begun by slalom in 1929 for men, and 1935 for women. Other races have progressively been organized, starting with downhill in 1937.
Every year, one or several Canadian ski resorts organize the events, generally beginning from end of March, after the last world cup race. Each title is given after a unique race. Some races may be cancelled (principally speed races) for weather or snow quality reasons.

The five disciplines are :
Downhill
Super-G
Giant slalom
Slalom
Combined (not organised every year)

Results

Men

Women

References and notes

from 1929 to 2011 : 
 from 1995 :

Alpine skiing competitions in Canada